James F. Lewis (May 4, 1836August 17, 1886) was a Welsh American immigrant, lawyer, and the first chief justice of the Supreme Court of Nevada, serving on the court from 1864 to 1873.  He was also the youngest chief justice in the history of Nevada, having been just 28 years old when he became chief justice.

Biography

Born in Wales in 1836, Lewis and his parents emigrated to the United States before his 4th birthday.  They resided in Utica, New York, where he was raised and educated, learning the telegraphy trade.  He was hired as the manager of the Racine, Wisconsin, office of the Western Union Telegraph Company and traveled west to Racine with his younger brother, William, in 1855.  He educated his brother in telegraphy, and William took over as manager of the office when Lewis quit to focus on the study of law.

He was admitted to the bar in Wisconsin in 1861, then left Racine for Virginia City, Nevada Territory.  He earned respect in his legal career in Nevada, and within three years, when Nevada was admitted to the Union as the 36th U.S. state, he was elected as one of the first justices of the Supreme Court of Nevada.  The original Supreme Court was composed of three elected justices, with initial terms of 2, 4, and 6 years—to be determined by lot after the election.  Lewis drew the short (2-year) term and thus became the first chief justice of the court.

He was re-elected in 1866, and served a full six-year term, retiring from the court after the end of that term in January 1873.

On retiring from the court, he went into private practice in partnership with W. E. F. Deal in Virginia City.  Lewis suffered from severe Asthma for his entire life, and was forced to quit Virginia City in 1881 due to trouble with that affliction.

He moved to Tombstone, Arizona Territory, where he started a new partnership with Judge H. C. Dibble and Judge George Berry.  But while living at Arizona, he suffered a disastrous fire which destroyed his entire law library.

He removed to San Francisco, California, in 1884, and resumed his legal career in partnership with C. K. Bonestell.

James F. Lewis died suddenly during a trip to Arizona, at Fort Yuma, in August 1886.

Personal life and family
James F. Lewis was a son of William J. Lewis and his wife Jane ( Turnor).  James' younger brother, William Turnor Lewis, went on to become a prominent businessman in Racine, Wisconsin, co-founding the Mitchell-Lewis Motor Company.

James F. Lewis married Mary Elizabeth Raymond, the eldest daughter of Racine County pioneer Seneca Raymond, in November 1864.  Her grandfather was Elisha Raymond, the namesake of Raymond, Wisconsin.  They had no known children.

References

|-

1836 births
1886 deaths
Welsh emigrants to the United States
People from Utica, New York
People from Racine, Wisconsin
People from Virginia City, Nevada
People from Tombstone, Arizona
Lawyers from San Francisco
Justices of the Nevada Supreme Court
Chief Justices of the Nevada Supreme Court